The Mennonite Church (MC), also known as the Old Mennonite Church, was formerly the oldest and largest body of Mennonites in North America. It was a loosely-affiliated collection of Mennonite conferences based in the United States and Canada, mainly of Swiss and South German origin. The group dated to the settlement of Germantown in 1683 and included 112,311 members in North America in 1997. Many of the conferences that were considered part of the Old Mennonite Church participated in the Mennonite General Conference from 1898-1971 and the Mennonite General Assembly from 1971-2002. The Mennonite General Assembly voted to merge with the General Conference Mennonite Church at a joint session in Wichita, Kansas, in 1995. In 2002, the two groups merged and then divided along national lines into Mennonite Church USA and Mennonite Church Canada.

Origins 
The conferences that made up the Mennonite Church originated from two groups, Mennonites and Amish.

Polity and ministry 
The polity of the Mennonite Church varied because of influences of various originating groups and settlement patterns. It also changed over time. The basic pattern was a conference-based polity with conferences having authority over local congregations. Conferences had authority on doctrine and practice and could discipline ministers and congregations. Congregations selected ministers and owned church buildings. The parts of the Mennonite Church with Amish origin tended to give more authority over doctrine and practice to leaders of local congregations. 

The traditional pattern of ministry was a plural unsalaried ministry with a bishop, preacher, and deacon. In many conferences, bishops were assigned to several congregations, though Amish-origin congregations often had a single bishop per congregation. In the 1950s and 1960s, this pattern began to change. Congregations began calling pastors to replace preachers. In the more progressive parts of the Mennonite church, these pastors were seminary-trained and salaried. The office of bishop was renamed as a superintendent or overseer in many conferences. The office of deacon declined in usage. By the 1990s, most of the conferences participating in Mennonite General Assembly had a pastor for each local congregation and district superintendents or overseers rather than traditional plural ministry, with the significant exception of the strong bishop system in Lancaster Mennonite Conference.

Participating conferences 
In 1957, the conferences that participated in Mennonite General Conference were:

 Franconia (no official delegates to General Conference)
 Lancaster (no official delegates to General Conference)
 Washington County, Maryland and Franklin County, Pennsylvania (no official delegates to General Conference)
 Ontario
 Virginia
 Ohio and Eastern
 Indiana and Michigan
 Illinois
 Allegheny
 Iowa and Nebraska
 South Central
 Alberta and Saskatchewan
 Pacific Coast
 Conservative Mennonite (no official delegates to General Conference)
 North Central
 Ontario Amish Mennonite (no official delegates to General Conference)
 South Pacific
 Puerto Rico
 India
 Argentina

In 1997, the conferences that participated in Mennonite General Assembly were:

 Allegheny Mennonite Conference
 Atlantic Coast Conference of the Mennonite Church
 Franconia Mennonite Conference
 Franklin Mennonite Conference
 Gulf States Mennonite Conference
 Illinois Mennonite Conference
 Indiana-Michigan Mennonite Conference
 Iowa-Nebraska Conference of the Mennonite Church
 Lancaster Mennonite Conference
 Mennonite Conference of Eastern Canada
 New York Mennonite Conference
 Pacific Southwest Mennonite Conference
 Puerto Rico Mennonite Conference
 Rocky Mountain Mennonite Conference
 South Central Mennonite Conference
 Southeast Mennonite Conference
 Virginia Mennonite Conference

References

Mennonitism
1683 establishments in North America
2002 disestablishments in North America
Amish in North America